The Dancin' Fool is a surviving 1920 American silent romantic comedy film produced by Famous Players-Lasky and distributed by Paramount Pictures. Sam Wood directed this one of his earliest efforts. Wallace Reid and Bebe Daniels star, at the time Paramount was making them a popular team in replacement of Reid's previous female lead Ann Little. A copy of this film survives in the collection of the Museum of Modern Art, New York.

Plot
As described in a film publication, Sylvester Tibble (Reid), a country yokel, comes to New York City to work at his uncle Enoch Jones's (Hatton) jug business for $6 per week and earns extra money dancing at a jazz cabaret. He becomes the dance partner of Junie Budd (Daniels). They soon find romance while performing Apache dance routines. Sylvester also makes a success of his uncle's business by introducing modern business methods.

Cast
Wallace Reid as Sylvester Tibble
Bebe Daniels as Junie Budd
Raymond Hatton as Enoch Jones
Willis Marks as Tim Meeks
George B. Williams as McGammon
Lillian Leighton as Ma Budd
Carlos San Martin as Elkus
William H. Brown as Gabby Gaines
Tully Marshall as Charle Harkins
Ruth Ashby as Dorothy Harkins
Ernest Joy as Tom Reed

See also
Wallace Reid filmography

References

External links

1920 films
American silent feature films
Films directed by Sam Wood
Paramount Pictures films
1920 romantic comedy films
American romantic comedy films
American black-and-white films
1920s American films
Silent romantic comedy films
Silent American comedy films
1920s English-language films